Sütpınar can refer to:

 Sütpınar, Erzincan
 Sütpınar, Narman